Bborubong (뾰루봉) is a mountain of South Korea in Gapyeong that is connected to Hwayasan. It has an elevation of 710 metres

See also
List of mountains of Korea

References

Mountains of South Korea